Chorba or shorba (from Ottoman Turkish   or Persian  ) is a broad class of stews or rich soups found in national cuisines across the Iran, Middle East, Maghreb, Central and Eastern Europe, Central Asia and the Indian subcontinent. It is often prepared with added ingredients but served alone as a broth or with bread.

Etymology
The word chorba in English and in many Balkan languages is a loan from the Ottoman Turkish  , which itself is a loan from Persian  . The spelling shorba could be a direct loan into English from Persian, or through a Central or South Asian intermediary.

The word is ultimately a compound of   meaning 'salty, brackish' and   meaning 'stew, gruel, spoon-meat'. The former is from Parthian   meaning 'salty', and the latter from Middle Persian  meaning 'gruel, spoon-meat'.

The etymology can be definitively tied to Persian through the cognate  ; in Modern Persian, while   evolved to mean 'broth, stew',   simply means 'soup'.

That said, it is highly likely that phono-semantic matching occurred during the loaning of the word into Arabic, which would explain the orthographical difference.

In the Indian subcontinent, the term  in Hindi simply means gravy. It is a Mughlai dish and it has vegetarian forms such as tomato shorba.

Types
Shorwa is a traditional Afghan dish which is a simple dish which is usually mixed with bread on the dastarkhān. It is a long process and a pressure-cooker is usually used, as it reduces the process to 2 hours. The main ingredients for shorwa are potatoes, beans and meat. It is commonly served with Afghan bread.

Ciorbă, as called in Moldova and Romania, consists of various vegetables, meat and herbs. Borș is a sour soup that is used in the Moldova region. It is also has beneficial health effects. It is served hot to stimulate digestion and be effective against colds. There are several types of this dish, such as ciorbă de perișoare, leek soup, Romanian borscht, and borș de burechiușe.

Gallery

See also

 List of soups
 List of stews

References

Turkish soups
Turkish words and phrases
Bosnia and Herzegovina cuisine
Indian cuisine
Kazakhstani cuisine
Kyrgyz cuisine
Pakistani soups and stews
Arab cuisine
Uzbekistani cuisine
Romanian cuisine
Moldovan cuisine
Uyghur cuisine
Tajik cuisine
Soviet cuisine
Bulgarian cuisine
Iranian soups

tr:Çorba